Gilbert Y. Lao (born September 13, 1978) is a Filipino former professional basketball player and coach in the Philippine Basketball Association. He was nicknamed "The Enforcer" in his college days.

Draft
Lao was drafted by Coca-Cola Tigers in 2002, 11th overall.

With the Texters, He was able to win 5 titles as a pro with the team.

References 

1978 births
Living people
Filipino men's basketball players
Basketball players from Manila
UST Growling Tigers basketball players
Centers (basketball)
Power forwards (basketball)
Powerade Tigers players
Rain or Shine Elasto Painters players
Barangay Ginebra San Miguel players
Barako Bull Energy Boosters players
Filipino men's basketball coaches
Blackwater Bossing coaches
Powerade Tigers draft picks
FEU Tamaraws basketball coaches
TNT Tropang Giga coaches
Adamson Soaring Falcons basketball coaches